Verkhnyaya Inta (Vylys Inta) is an urban locality (an urban-type settlement) under the administrative jurisdiction of the town of republic significance of Inta in the Komi Republic, Russia. As of the 2010 Census, its population was 1,106.

Administrative and municipal status
Within the framework of administrative divisions, the urban-type settlement of Verkhnyaya Inta, together with one rural locality (the settlement of Kochmes), is incorporated as Verkhnyaya Inta Urban-Type Settlement Administrative Territory, which is subordinated to the town of republic significance of Inta. Within the framework of municipal divisions, Verkhnyaya Inta is a part of Inta Urban Okrug.

References

Notes

Sources

Urban-type settlements in the Komi Republic
